The 1999 Dura Lube/Kmart 300 was the 26th stock car race of the 1999 NASCAR Winston Cup Series season and the third iteration of the event. The race was held on Sunday, September 19, 1999, in Loudon, New Hampshire, at New Hampshire International Speedway, a  permanent, oval-shaped, low-banked racetrack. The race took the scheduled 300 laps to complete. Within the final laps of the race, Team SABCO driver Joe Nemechek would manage to fend off eventual second-place finisher, Joe Gibbs Racing driver Tony Stewart when a caution with three to go would come to end the race under caution. The win was Nemechek's first career NASCAR Winston Cup Series victory and his only win of the season. To fill out the podium, Joe Gibbs Racing driver Bobby Labonte would finish third.

Background 

New Hampshire International Speedway is a 1.058-mile (1.703 km) oval speedway located in Loudon, New Hampshire which has hosted NASCAR racing annually since the early 1990s, as well as an IndyCar weekend and the oldest motorcycle race in North America, the Loudon Classic. Nicknamed "The Magic Mile", the speedway is often converted into a 1.6-mile (2.6 km) road course, which includes much of the oval. The track was originally the site of Bryar Motorsports Park before being purchased and redeveloped by Bob Bahre. The track is currently one of eight major NASCAR tracks owned and operated by Speedway Motorsports.

Entry list 

 (R) denotes rookie driver.

Practice 
Originally, three practice sessions were scheduled to be held, with one on Friday, September 17 and two on Saturday, September 18. However, due to inclement rain from Hurricane Floyd on Friday, the lone Friday session was cancelled.

First practice 
The first practice session was held on Saturday, September 18, at 8:30 AM EST. The session would last for two hours.

Final practice 
The final practice session, sometimes referred to as Happy Hour, was held on Saturday, September 18, after the preliminary 1999 New Hampshire 100. The session would last for one hour.

Qualifying 
Qualifying was scheduled to be split into two rounds, with the first round being held on Friday, September 17, and the second round on Saturday, September 18. However, due to inclement rain from Hurricane Floyd on Friday, the first round of qualifying was cancelled, leaving only one round of qualifying run on Saturday.

Qualifying was held on Saturday, September 18, at 11:00 AM EST. Each driver would have one lap to set a time.

Four drivers would fail to qualify: Darrell Waltrip, Derrike Cope, Dick Trickle, and Andy Belmont.

Full qualifying results

Race results

References 

1999 NASCAR Winston Cup Series
NASCAR races at New Hampshire Motor Speedway
September 1999 sports events in the United States
1999 in sports in New Hampshire